Below are the squads selected for the football tournament at the 2013 Mediterranean Games hosted in the city of Mersin in Turkey, which took place on 19–27 June 2013.

The teams were national U19 sides.

Group A

Albania

Bosnia and Herzegovina
Head coach:

Morocco

Turkey

Group B

Italy
Head coach:

Libya

Macedonia

Tunisia

References

Squads
Mediterranean Games football squads